In Greek mythology, Tara was one of the seven Hesperides and sister of Aiopis, Antheia, Kalypso, Donakis, Mermesa and Nelisa.

Note

Reference 

 Walters, Henry Beauchamp, History of Ancient Pottery, Greek, Etruscan, and Roman, Based on the Work of Samuel Birch, Volume 2, London, J. Murray, 1905.

Hesperides
Nymphs